After Hours was a Canadian variety television series which aired on CBC Television in 1953.

The series was an early career effort by John Aylesworth and Frank Peppiatt who later produced Hee Haw.

Premise

After Hours combined humour sketches with a series of music short films. The music films were produced in the United States by Lou Snader and purchased by CBC Television prior to the network's initial broadcasts. The music films, which resembled music videos, featured songs by performers such as Charlie Barnet, Cab Calloway, Nat King Cole, Duke Ellington, Lionel Hampton, Peggy Lee, George Shearing and Mel Tormé.

The series was hosted by Rick Campbell and announced by Mike Darrow. Jill Foster was a series regular as were producer/writers Aylesworth and Peppiatt. On the 16th episode, the series introduced a three-member band featuring Jack Kane (clarinet), Rudi Toth (piano) and Johnny Niosi (drums) who performed in front of a backdrop painting of sixteen musicians.

Scheduling
The series normally appeared on Fridays at 10:00 p.m. (Eastern), with some episodes airing on Tuesdays and on certain Friday evenings in April and May. Selected Friday episodes were also broadcast earlier during those months. Episodes were hour-long from the 2 January debut until 10 April after which a half-hour format was adopted. The final episode was broadcast on 3 July 1953.

References

External links
 
 

CBC Television original programming
1950s Canadian variety television series
1950s Canadian sketch comedy television series
1953 Canadian television series debuts
1953 Canadian television series endings
Black-and-white Canadian television shows